Jón Gunnlaugsson  (born ) is an Icelandic former footballer who played the position of defender. He was part of the Iceland national football team between 1974 and 1977. He played 5 matches.

See also
 List of Iceland international footballers

References

Further reading
 
 

1949 births
Living people
Jon Gunnlaugsson
Jon Gunnlaugsson
Jon Gunnlaugsson
Place of birth missing (living people)
Association football defenders